= Pozo de la Piedra =

Coordinates: 27°35′S 67°08′W

- Municipality and town
- Interactive map of Pozo de la Piedra
- Country: Argentina
- Province: Catamarca Province
- Time zone: UTC−3 (ART)

Pozo de la Piedra is a town and municipality in Catamarca Province in northwestern Argentina.
